Sarkunan a/l Krishnansamy (born 4 August 1996) is a Malaysian professional footballer who plays as a central midfielder.

Club career

Selangor
Sarkunan started his career playing for Selangor youth team before being promoted into first team in December 2016. Sarkunan made his debut for the club in a 3–1 win over Penang coming off from the bench on 28 October 2017. On 1 September 2018, he scored his first professional goal against Pahang away with eventual 3–1 win in Malaysia Cup.

Negeri Sembilan (loan)

On 15 December 2021, Sarkunan joined Negeri Sembilan on a season-long loan.

Career statistics

Club

1 Includes AFC Cup and AFC Champions League.

References

External links
 
 Profile at faselangor.my

1996 births
Living people
Malaysian footballers
People from Selangor
Selangor FA players
Negeri Sembilan FC players
Malaysia Super League players
Tamil sportspeople
Malaysian people of Tamil descent
Association football midfielders